Addil Somani (born 22 October 1967) is a former Ugandan born New Zealand cricketer.  Somani was a right-handed batsman who bowled leg break.  He was born in Kampala, Uganda.

Somani's first-class debut came for English county side Nottinghamshire in 1987, against Oxford University, which was his only first-class match for the county side.

In 1989, he made his first-class debut for Northern Districts against Canterbury.  Between the 1988/89 and 1993/94 seasons, he represented Northern Districts in 7 first-class matches, the last of which came against Wellington.  In his 8 career first-class matches, he scored 177 runs at a batting average of 17.70, with a high score of 40.  With the ball he took 9 wickets at a bowling average of 37.55, with best figures of 2/7.

He made his List-A debut for Northern Districts in the 1993/94 season against Otago.  During that season he represented the team in 5 List-A matches, the last of which came against Wellington.  In his 5 List-A matches, he scored 44 runs at an average of 11.00, with a high score of 15.  With the ball he took 3 wickets at an average of 16.00, with best figures of 2/16.

References

External links
Addil Somani at Cricinfo
Addil Somani at CricketArchive

1967 births
Living people
Cricketers from Kampala
New Zealand people of Ugandan descent
New Zealand cricketers
Nottinghamshire cricketers
Northern Districts cricketers